Býkev is a municipality and village in Mělník District in the Central Bohemian Region of the Czech Republic. It has about 500 inhabitants.

Administrative parts
The village of Jenišovice is an administrative part of Býkev.

History
The first written mention of Býkev is from 1392. Jenišovice was founded around 1250. For centuries, agriculture has been the main livelihood of the inhabitants. That did not change until 1994, when the State Farm ceased to exist.

Transport
The interstate I/16 road passes through Býkev. The railway line Kralupy nad Vltavou–Roudnice nad Labem goes through the municipality, but there is no railway station. The municipality is served only by bus.

Sights
The landmark of Býkov is the monument to the victims of World War I, built in the form of the Czech Lion (heraldic symbol of the Czech Republic) in 1918–1920.

References

External links

Villages in Mělník District